Diospyros everettii is a tree in the family Ebenaceae. Inflorescences bear up to six flowers. D. everettii is found in Borneo and the Philippines.

References

everettii
Plants described in 1909
Trees of Borneo
Trees of the Philippines